The Code is an English-language Finnish documentary about Linux from 2001, featuring some of the most influential people of the free software movement.

Featured advocates
Free and Open-source advocates or programmers in the film:
Linus Torvalds
Richard Stallman
Alan Cox
Eric S. Raymond
Robert "Bob" Young
Jon "maddog" Hall
Theodore Y. "Ted" Ts'o
David S. Miller
Miguel de Icaza
Ari Lemmke
Eric Allman
Andrew Leonard
Larry Augustin
Martti Tienari
Sun Yu-Fang
Liang Changtai
Jay Salzenberg

See also
 Revolution OS: A 2001 documentary that traces the twenty-year history of GNU, Linux, open source, and the free software movement.

External links 
 Official homepage (Archived)
 

Finnish documentary films
Linux
2001 films
English-language Finnish films
Documentary films about free software
2001 documentary films
2000s English-language films